Tricot may refer to:

 Tricot (fabric)
 Tricot, Oise, a commune in France

Music
 Tricot (band), a Japanese math rock group
 Tricot Machine, a Canadian indie pop group